Fatezhsky (masculine), Fatezhskaya (feminine), or Fatezhskoye (neuter) may refer to:

Fatezhsky District, a district of Kursk Oblast, Russia
Fatezhskaya, a rural locality (a village) in Kurgan Oblast, Russia